The Federal College of Education, Katsina is a federal government higher education institution located in Katsina, Katsina State, Nigeria. It is affiliated to Bayero University Kano for its degree programmes. The current Provost is Aliyu Idris Funtua.

History 
The Federal College of Education (Technical), Katsina was established in 1976.

Library 
The College library is academy library that was established in 1975 as the main Library. The library has over 50,000 Volumes of books, 500 seating capacity space with  electronic - library facilities of over 100 computers and internet connectivity. the information resources in the library support and compliment all the course offer in the college. the main library coordinate and maintained other departmental libraries in the school.

Sections 
The college Library has the following sections:

 General reading room section
 Special Collections Sections
 Library services sections: This section have some services provided under it
 Loans Services: the normal loans of information resources is four weeks for staff and two weeks for students.
 Reservation service: is main concern with those books with high demand or heavily used are removed from the open shelves and put them on closed access collection in the reserve section for effective and efficient controlled of the way these books will be used by staff and students.
 Reference Service: the reference Librarian is always available to answer queries for students and staff especially on how to locate material and where to find reliable piece of information.
 Reprographics Service: the library is equipped  with facilities for this service of reproduction of information resources.

Courses 
The institution offers the following courses;

 Agricultural Science Education
 Education and Mathematics
 Fine And Applied Arts
 Chemistry Education
 Building Technology Education
 Education and English Language
 Computer Education
 Education and Hausa
 Education and Arabic
 Technical Education
 Biology Education
 Education and Social Studies
 Home Economics and Education
 Integrated Science
 Business Education
 Primary Education Studies

Affiliation 
The institution is affiliated with the Bayero University Kano to offer programmes leading to Bachelor of Education, (B.Ed.) in;

 Education and Physics
 Education and Chemistry
 Education and English Language
 Physical and Health Education
 Education and Islamic Studies
 Education and Arabic
 Education and Biology
 Education and Mathematics
 Education and Hausa

References 

Federal colleges of education in Nigeria
1976 establishments in Nigeria
Educational institutions established in 1976
Katsina